In integrated circuits, optical interconnects refers to any system of transmitting signals from one part of an integrated circuit to another using light. Optical interconnects have been the topic of study due to the high latency and power consumption incurred by conventional metal interconnects in transmitting electrical signals over long distances, such as in interconnects classed as global interconnects. The International Technology Roadmap for Semiconductors (ITRS) has highlighted interconnect scaling as a problem for the semiconductor industry.

In electrical interconnects, nonlinear signals (e.g. digital signals) are transmitted by copper wires conventionally, and these electrical wires all have resistance and capacitance which severely limits the rise time of signals when the dimension of the wires are scaled down. Optical solution are used to transmit signals through long distances to substitute interconnection between dies within the integrated circuit (IC) package. 

In order to control the optical signals inside the small IC package properly, microelectromechanical system (MEMS) technology can be used to integrate the optical components (i.e. optical waveguides, optical fibers, lens, mirrors, optical actuators, optical sensors etc.) and the electronic parts together effectively.

Problems of the current interconnect in the package

Conventional physical metal wires possess both resistance and capacitance, limiting the rise time of signals. Bits of information will overlap with each other when the frequency of signal is increased to a certain level.

Benefits of using optical interconnection
Optical interconnections can provide benefits over conventional metal wires which include:
	More predictable timing
	Reduction of power and area for clock distribution
	Distance independence of performance of optical interconnects
	No frequency-dependent Cross-talk
	Architectural advantages
	Reducing power dissipation in interconnects
	Voltage isolation
	Density of interconnects
	Reducing the wiring layers
	Chips could be tested in a non-contact optical test set
	Benefits of short optical pulses

Challenges for optical interconnect
However, there are still many technical challenges in implementing dense optical interconnects to silicon CMOS chips. These challenges are listed as below: 
	Receiver circuits and low-capacitance integration of photodetectors
	Evolutionary improvement in optoelectronic devices
	Absence of appropriate practical optomechanical technology
	Integration technologies
       Polarization control
       Temperature dependencies and process variation
       Losses and errors
       Testability
       Packaging

See also
 Organic light-emitting transistor
 Silicon photonics

References

Integrated circuits